Rogerio Leichtweis (born June 28, 1988) is a Paraguayan  football forward who currently plays for Club Deportivo Guabirá.

Career 

Rogerio Leichtweis began his career in Club Olimpia. Then he was transferred to Club Libertad. From 2009 to 2010 he was in Tacuary on loan, where he had only four appearances.

For the 2011 season, Leichtweis was transferred to Sportivo San Lorenzo on loan. The next year was loaned to Club Cerro Porteño (Presidente Franco), where he finished goalscorer of the team with 14 goals in 36 matches, and was third in the Top Scorers table of the Torneo Apertura.

In December 2012, Leichtweis arrived in Colombia after signing a one-year loan deal with Deportes Tolima until the end of the year.

National team 

Leichtweis was called up on November 14, 2012 by coach Gerardo Pelusso for a friendly match against Guatemala. However, he remained on the bench throughout all the match, which ended 3-1 with Paraguayan victory over Guatemala.

References

External links

1988 births
Living people
Paraguayan people of German descent
Paraguayan footballers
Paraguayan expatriate footballers
Association football forwards
Paraguayan Primera División players
Categoría Primera A players
Bolivian Primera División players
Club Libertad footballers
Club Tacuary footballers
Club Sportivo San Lorenzo footballers
Cerro Porteño (Presidente Franco) footballers
Deportes Tolima footballers
Club Atlético 3 de Febrero players
Sportivo Luqueño players
General Díaz footballers
Guarani FC players
Guabirá players
Paraguayan expatriate sportspeople in Bolivia
Paraguayan expatriate sportspeople in Colombia
Paraguayan expatriate sportspeople in Brazil
Expatriate footballers in Bolivia
Expatriate footballers in Colombia
Expatriate footballers in Brazil